Shadrach Meshach Lockridge (March 7, 1913 – April 4, 2000) was the Pastor of Calvary Baptist Church, a prominent African-American congregation in San Diego, California, from 1953 to 1993. He was known for his preaching across the United States and around the world.

Life and work
Lockridge was born in Robertson County, Texas, the oldest of eight children and the son of a Baptist minister.  A graduate of Bishop College in Marshall, Texas, he worked for two years as a high school English teacher. In 1940 in Dallas, he felt led to preach. In 1941 he married Virgil Mae Thompson.

In 1942, he accepted his first pastorate at Fourth Ward Baptist Church in Ennis, Texas. In August 1952, he was named pastor of Calvary Baptist Church in San Diego where he served until retiring in 1993.

During Lockridge's tenure at Calvary Baptist, a predominantly African-American congregation, his ministry reached more than 100,000 people. He preached at crusades, revivals, religious rallies and evangelistic conferences around the world.

He also served in key regional, state and national positions with the Baptist Church, including being elected as the Moderator of the Progressive Baptist District Association, President of the California Missionary Baptist State Convention, and the first president of the National Missionary Baptist Convention of America, where he held all three major positions simultaneously.

He held doctorates and numerous honorary degrees, and was often sought as a public speaker, even after he retired in 1993.  He served as guest lecturer at numerous schools and universities and on the faculty of several others, including the Billy Graham School of Evangelism.

Lockridge was active in the civil rights movement, and under his leadership Calvary Baptist hosted several of its leaders, including Martin Luther King Jr.

Lockridge's best-known message is "Amen"("That's my King!"), notably the six and a half minute description of Jesus Christ contained at the end of the hour-long sermon (the popular title comes from Lockridge's repeated refrain).  YouTube, Google Videos, Godtube, and other video-sharing websites have numerous variations of this message in video clips of varying lengths, in both English and Spanish (subtitles or with a translator), with various video and musical backdrops, and user views reaching into the multi-millions.

Publications

References

External links
 .
 .
 .
 .

1913 births
2000 deaths
People from Robertson County, Texas
Bishop College alumni
20th-century Baptist ministers from the United States